The Marshall Recreation Center at Marshall University is located at 5th Avenue and 20th Street in Huntington, West Virginia. The complex is part of a $95 million expansion plan that includes two new "living-learning" residence halls

History 
The Health and Wellness Center was proposed in a Board of Governors meeting on November 10, 2004 by the campus Student Government Association.

On October 12, 2006, Marshall University purchased the Twentieth Street Baptist Church for $1 million with the intent of demolition. The church's first service dates back to December 1926 and hosted its last service on March 25. On January 24, 2007, the school's board of governors approved a contract to tear down the church in early May; demolition began on May 21.

Financing
On May 14, 2007, the university Board of Governors approved a resolution on a partnership between the university and Capstone Management. Capstone will own and operate the facilities until it has a return on investment. The public-private partnership, the first in the state of West Virginia, will help speed up construction and keeps other projects, such as the Engineering laboratory, in the pipeline. It will also help keep the new buildings off the balance sheet.

The expansion is being funded with different bonds by two entities. The university's bonds are insured, while Capstone's are without worth at the moment because the company will not have a return on investment until 2018. The public-private partnership will only work if the buildings create a revenue stream; the dormitory collects housing fees, while the student recreation center collects student fees. The funds will pay off the bonds. Capstone will own and operate the facilities for 30 years when ownership will transfer to the university.

See also 
 Buildings at Marshall University
 Cityscape of Huntington, West Virginia
 Marshall University

References

External links
Official Site

Marshall University
University and college student recreation centers in the United States
Buildings and structures in Huntington, West Virginia